Juan Silveira dos Santos (born 1 February 1979), commonly known as Juan, is a Brazilian former professional footballer who played as a centre-back. He currently works as Flamengo's Technical Manager.

Having begun his career with Flamengo, he spent a decade playing in Europe in service of Bayer Leverkusen and Roma before returning to Brazil with Internacional in 2012.

Juan earned 79 caps and scored seven international goals for Brazil. He represented the nation at two FIFA World Cups, three FIFA Confederations Cups and three Copa América tournaments, winning two apiece of the latter two events.

Club career

Early career
Born in Rio de Janeiro, Juan played for six years for Flamengo in Brazil. In 2002, he moved to Bayer Leverkusen. He played five years in Germany scoring ten goals for Bayer. In 2007, he moved to Roma for €6.3 million.

Roma
Juan played for Roma  between 2007 and 2012. In all competitions for Roma he scored 11 goals in more than 140 appearances. With Roma he won one Coppa Italia and Supercoppa Italiana. He was a first-choice centre-back for Roma, and wore the number four jersey.  Juan scored his first goal for Roma against Reggina on 16 September 2007.

In the 2011–12 season, he usually played alongside Gabriel Heinze. He scored his seventh goal for Roma in a 5–1 win over Cesena on 21 January 2012. He scored again in Roma's 4–2 loss Cagliari in Sardinia, followed by his third goal of the season, and the opening goal, in Roma's 4–0 demolition of Internazionale at the Stadio Olimpico. He scored nine goals for Roma during his time there.

Internacional

On 16 July 2012, Roma and Juan agreed to cancel his contract by mutual consent, which was set to end on 30 June 2013. On the same day, Juan signed a two-year contract with the club of Porto Alegre Internacional, with a one-year option.

Return to Flamengo
On 11 November 2015, Juan and Internacional agreed to cancel his contract by mutual consent, almost a month later on 8 December 2015, Juan confirmed his return to Flamengo.

Juan announced his retirement after winning the 2019 Campeonato Carioca and played his farewell match on 27 April 2019, in Flamengo's 3–1 win over Cruzeiro.

International career
Juan played on Brazil's Copa América-winning teams in 2004 and  2007, also winning the FIFA Confederations Cup in 2005 and 2009. He scored the winning goal in the penalty shootout at the end of the 2004 Copa América Final against Argentina in Lima. In the quarter-finals of the same competition in 2007, he opened the scoring in a 6–1 thrashing of Chile in Puerto La Cruz.

On 28 June 2010, Juan scored the first goal against Chile with a headed finish from a corner as Brazil won 3–0 to advance to the quarter-finals of the 2010 FIFA World Cup.

Career statistics

Club

International

Scores and results list Brazil's goal tally first, score column indicates score after each Juan goal.

Honours
Flamengo
Campeonato Carioca (6): 1996, 1999, 2000, 2001, 2017, 2019
Copa dos Campeões: 2001
Copa Mercosur: 1999
Copa de Oro: 1996

Roma
Coppa Italia: 2007–08
Supercoppa Italiana: 2007

Internacional
Campeonato Gaúcho: 2013, 2014, 2015
Brazil
Copa América: 2004, 2007
FIFA Confederations Cup: 2005, 2009
Lunar New Year Cup: 2005
Individual
kicker Bundesliga Team of the Season: 2003–04
 Copa América Team of the Tournament: 2004

References

External links
 
 Leverkusen who's who

1979 births
Living people
Footballers from Rio de Janeiro (city)
Brazilian footballers
Association football central defenders
CR Flamengo footballers
Bayer 04 Leverkusen players
A.S. Roma players
Sport Club Internacional players
Campeonato Brasileiro Série A players
Bundesliga players
Serie A players
Brazil youth international footballers
Brazil under-20 international footballers
Brazil international footballers
2003 FIFA Confederations Cup players
2004 Copa América players
2005 FIFA Confederations Cup players
2006 FIFA World Cup players
2007 Copa América players
2009 FIFA Confederations Cup players
2010 FIFA World Cup players
Copa América-winning players
FIFA Confederations Cup-winning players
Brazilian expatriate footballers
Brazilian expatriate sportspeople in Germany
Expatriate footballers in Germany
Brazilian expatriate sportspeople in Italy
Expatriate footballers in Italy